The Lophophorata or Tentaculata are a Lophotrochozoan clade consisting of the Brachiozoa and the Bryozoa. They have a lophophore. Molecular phylogenetic analyses suggest that lophophorates are protostomes, but on morphological grounds they have been assessed as deuterostomes. Fossil finds of a genus of segmented worm named Wufengella suggest that they evolved from a worm close to annelids.

References